Gerald Graham 'Graham' Peel (1877 – November 1937) was an English composer.

Life

Graham Peel's father was Gerald Peel, a millionaire Lancashire cotton spinner and magistrate of Pendlebury, near Manchester, England.

During his life, Peel was one of the first persons 'to take parties inside prisons to entertain the inmates', and of unobtrusive character, was later remembered for his generosity.  Clothes and jobs for prisoners were provided through Peel with his involvement in the Dorset and Bournemouth Discharged Prisoners' Aid Society.

He was a resident of 'Marden Ash', Bournemouth on his death, after a year's illness.  A philanthropist, he died leaving £191,499.

Compositions

Peel wrote more than 100 songs, many of them settings of A. E. Housman.  Many settings were for folk songs and pianoforte solos, and performed afar as Australia.  His tunes included: 
Almond, wild almond 
Go down to Kew in lilac time 
Her loveliness 
In summer time on Bredon (well regarded, and written c. 1908)
Loveliest of trees 
Oh like a Queen 
Spring waters 
The early morning 
The lute-player 
The wild swan

The 1920 tune 'The challenge' was composed by Peel to the words of the poem of the same name by Scottish-Australian poet and bush balladeer Will H. Ogilvie (1869–1963).

References

1877 births
1937 deaths
20th-century English composers
English songwriters
Musicians from Bournemouth
Prison music